This is a list of the Austrian Singles Chart number-one hits of 1997.

See also
1997 in music

References

1997 in Austria
1997 record charts
Lists of number-one songs in Austria